Mhorkya is a 2018 Marathi film directed by Amar Bharat Deokar and produced by Swastik Preeti Film Productions and co produced by Amar Chitravani. It was bankrolled by Aespaes Lab and featured Raman Deokar and Amar Deokar in pivotal roles.

It won the National Film Award for Best Children's Film at the Indian 65th National Film Awards in 2018. It premiered on 14 January 2018, and was released worldwide on 24 January 2020.

Plot 
14-year-old Ashok (Ashya) is a shepherd who marches with his herds like he leads a parade and hates going to school. One day his friends drag him to school only to land him in the republic day parade practice session. But Ashya gets noticed for his powerful voice and asked to compete for the parade’s leadership spot

His school rival Baalya, who actually wants to be the leader, threatens him to withdraw. Ashya wants to learn parade but everyone refuses to teach him. His frantic search for the teacher begins with several options but he finds the person he wants. A mentally retarded soldier.

Cast 
 Raman Deokar
 Aishwarya Kamble
 Amar Bharat Deokar
 Yashraj karhade
 Anil Kamble
 Ramchandra Dhumal

Marketing and release

The official trailer of the film was unveiled by Rajshri Marathi on 15 January 2020.

This film was released on 7 February 2020.

Awards 
 65th National Film Award
 National Film Award for Best Children's Film : Mhorkya
 Special Mention : Raman Devkar (Child Artist)
 Special Mention : Yasharaj Karhade (Child Artist)

 16th Pune International Film Festival
 Best Actor : Raman Devkar
 Best Cinematography : Girish R.Jambhalikar
 Audience Choice Movie : Mhorkya

7th Kolhapur International Film Festival 2019
 Best Child Actor : Raman Devkar
 Best Screenplay  : Amar Deokar

References

External links
 

Indian children's films
Best Children's Film National Film Award winners
2010s Marathi-language films
2018 films